Shaini is a village in the Central District of Kamyaran County, Kurdistan Province, Iran. At the 2016 census, its population was 7500, in up to 750 families. The village is populated by Kurds.

References 

Towns and villages in Kamyaran County
Kurdish settlements in Kurdistan Province